Rayburn is an unincorporated community in Liberty County, Texas, United States.

Education
Rayburn is zoned to schools in the Tarkington Independent School District.

References

External links

Unincorporated communities in Liberty County, Texas
Unincorporated communities in Texas